The University of Southern California Gould School of Law (USC Gould), located in Los Angeles, California, is a law school within the University of Southern California. The oldest law school in the Southwestern United States, USC Law had its beginnings in 1896, and was officially established as a school of the university in 1900.

U.S. federal Court of Appeals judges
 Arthur Alarcón (1951) – Judge of the U.S. Ninth Circuit Court of Appeals (1979–1992)
 James Marshall Carter (1927) – Judge of the U.S. Ninth Circuit Court of Appeals (1967–1971); Judge of the U.S. District Court for the Southern District of California (1949–1967)
 Walter Raleigh Ely, Jr. (LL.M. 1949) – Judge of the U.S. Ninth Circuit Court of Appeals (1964–1979)
 Ferdinand Francis Fernandez (1962) – Senior Judge of the U.S. Ninth Circuit Court of Appeals (2002–present) – Judge of the U.S. Ninth Circuit Court of Appeals (1989–2002); Judge of the U.S. District Court for the Central District of California (1985–1989)
 Warren J. Ferguson (1949) – Judge of the U.S. Ninth Circuit Court of Appeals (1979–1986); Judge of the U.S. District Court for the Central District of California (1966–1979)
 Dorothy Wright Nelson (LL.M. 1956) – Judge of the U.S. Ninth Circuit Court of Appeals (1979–1995)
 David R. Thompson (1955) – Judge of the U.S. Ninth Circuit Court of Appeals (1985–1998)
 Charles E. Wiggins (1956) – Judge of the U.S. Ninth Circuit Court of Appeals (1984–1996)

U.S. federal District Court for the Central District of California judges
 William Matthew Byrne, Jr. (1956) – Judge of the U.S. District Court for the Central District of California (1971–1998)
 Thurmond Clarke (1927) – Judge of the U.S. District Court for the Central District of California (1966–1970); Judge of the U.S. District Court for the Southern District of California (1955–1966)
 Elisha Avery Crary (1929) – Judge of the U.S. District Court for the Central District of California (1966–1975); Judge of the U.S. District Court for the Southern District of California (1962–1966)
 Richard Arthur Gadbois, Jr. (1960) – Judge of the U.S. District Court for the Central District of California (1982–1996)
 Peirson Mitchell Hall – Judge of the U.S. District Court for the Central District of California (1966–1968); Judge of the U.S. District Court for the Southern District of California (1942–1966)
 James M. Ideman (1963) – Judge of the U.S. District Court for the Central District of California (1984–1998)
 David Vreeland Kenyon (1957) – Judge of the U.S. District Court for the Central District of California (1980–1995)
 George H. King (1974) – Judge of the U.S. District Court for the Central District of California (1995–present)
 Stephen G. Larson (1989) – Judge of the U.S. District Court for the Central District of California (2006–2009)
 Nora Margaret Manella (1975) – Judge of the U.S. District Court for the Central District of California (1998–2006)
 Edward Rafeedie (1959) – Judge of the U.S. District Court for the Central District of California (1982–1996)
 Albert Lee Stephens, Jr. (1938) – Judge of the U.S. District Court for the Central District of California (1966–1979); Judge of the U.S. District Court for the Southern District of California (1961–1966)
 Alicemarie Huber Stotler (1967) – Judge of the U.S. District Court for the Central District of California (1984–2009)
 Robert Mitsuhiro Takasugi (1959) – first Japanese American federal judge; Judge of the U.S. District Court for the Central District of California (1976–1996)
 Dickran Tevrizian (1965) – Judge of the U.S. District Court for the Central District of California (1985–2005)
 Laughlin Edward Waters, Sr. (1947) – Judge of the U.S. District Court for the Central District of California (1976–1986)
 David W. Williams (1937) – first African American federal judge west of the Mississippi River; Judge of the U.S. District Court for the Central District of California (1969–1981)

Other U.S. federal court judges
 Mary Ann Cohen (1967) – Judge of the United States Tax Court (1982–present)
 J. Lawrence Irving (1963) – Judge of the U.S. District Court for the Southern District of California (1982–1990)
 David W. Ling (1913) – Judge of the U.S. District Court for the District of Arizona (1936–1964)
 Leland Chris Nielsen (1946) – Judge of the U.S. District Court for the Southern District of California (1971–1985)
 Howard Boyd Turrentine (1939) – Judge of the U.S. District Court for the Southern District of California (1970–1984)
 Ronald M. Whyte (1967) – Judge of the U.S. District Court for the Northern District of California (1992–2009)

California Supreme Court justices
 David Eagleson (1950) – Associate Justice of the California Supreme Court (1987–1991)
 Douglas L. Edmonds (1910) – Associate Justice of the California Supreme Court (1936–1955)
 Frederick W. Houser (1900) – Associate Justice of the California Supreme Court (1937–1942)
 Marcus Kaufman (1956) – Associate Justice of the California Supreme Court (1987–1990)
 Joyce L. Kennard (1974) – first Asian-American to serve as an Associate Justice of the California Supreme Court (1989–2014)
 Malcolm M. Lucas (1953) – 26th Chief Justice of California (1987–1996); Associate Justice of the California Supreme Court (1984–1987); Judge of the U.S. District Court for the Central District of California (1971–1984) All four were appointed by Republican Governor George Deukmejian.

Business
 C. Bertrand Thompson (1900) – First African-American graduate of USC Law School at age 18, early scholar of scientific management
 Louis Galen (1951) – former CEO of Golden West Financial, philanthropist
 Sol Price (1957) – founder of Fed Mart and Price Club (Costco Wholesale Corp.)
 James E. Rogers (1963) – CEO & owner, Sunbelt Communications
 Richard Ziman (1967) – CEO, Arden Realty
 Stanley Gold (1967) – President and CEO of Shamrock Holdings
 Bruce Karatz (1970) – CEO of KB Home
 Jeff Smulyan (1972) – founder and CEO of Emmis Communications
Brian Grazer (left in 1975) – Oscar-winning co-founder of Imagine Entertainment
 Charles Prince (1975) – former chairman & CEO of Citigroup
 Richard Rosenblatt (1994) – Founder, CEO, Intermix & Demand Media; former Chairman, MySpace; Founder, former CEO, iMALL
 Larry Flax (1967) – Co-founder of California Pizza Kitchen

Other
 Tiffiny Blacknell – criminal defense attorney and community activist
 Steve Cooley (1973) – 41st Los Angeles County District Attorney
 Gordon Dean (1930) – former USC Law School professor; chairman of the US Atomic Energy Commission (AEC)
 Charles Gessler (1961) – deputy public defender and capital defense lawyer
 David Getches (1967) – former Dean and Raphael J. Moses Professor of Natural Resources Law at the University of Colorado School of Law
 Jack Carl Greenburg (1933) – former Chief Clerk of the California State Assembly
 George Hedges (1978) – senior partner at Quinn Emanuel Urquhart Oliver & Hedges LLP and attorney to  celebrity clients
 You Chung Hong (1924) – first Chinese American admitted to practice in California
 Frederick N. Howser (1930) – 22nd Attorney General of California
 Douglas Kmiec (1976) – former U.S. Ambassador to Malta, Caruso Family Chair in Constitutional Law at Pepperdine University, f former Dean and St. Thomas More Professor at The Catholic University of America, former Director of Law & Government Center, University of Notre Dame
 Jackie Lacey (1982) – first woman and first African American to serve as District Attorney of Los Angeles County
 Charles Older (1952) – California Superior Court judge presiding over trial of Charles Manson; also one of the  Flying Tigers pilots of World War II
 Aulana L. Peters (1973) – first African American and third woman to serve as commissioner of the U.S. Securities and Exchange Commission
 Margaret Radin (1976) –  law professor at Stanford Law School; former USC Law School professor
 E. Randol Schoenberg (1991) – attorney specializing in legal cases related to the recovery of looted or stolen artworks;  one of the central figures of the 2015 film Woman in Gold, which depicted the case he brought against the Austrian government .
 Mabel Walker Willebrandt (1916) – Assistant U.S. Attorney General (1921–1929)

Politics

 Arthur Alber–(1918) Los Angeles City Council member (1927–29)
 Bertrand W. Gearhart (1910) – lawyer and former member of the United States House of Representatives
 Fletcher Bowron (1911) – former mayor of Los Angeles
 J. Curtis Counts (1941) – Director of the Federal Mediation and Conciliation Service.
 Doug Emhoff (1990) – lawyer, Second Gentleman of the United States
 Buron Fitts (1916) – former Lieutenant Governor of California
 Thomas Kuchel (1935) – former United States Senator
 Craig Hosmer (1940) – former United States Representative
 Fred Hall (1941) – former Governor of Kansas
 James B. Utt (1946) – former United States Representative
 Carlos Moorhead (1949) – former United States Representative
 Robert Finch (1951) – former Lieutenant Governor of California, former United States Secretary of Health, Education, and Welfare
 Yvonne Brathwaite Burke (1956) – Los Angeles County supervisor, former member of the United States House of Representatives
 Michael L. Williams (1979) – senior commissioner of the Railroad Commission of Texas, Texas Commissioner of Education
 John Heilman (1982) – mayor of West Hollywood, lecturer at USC Gould
 James Stuart McKnight (1908) – Los Angeles City Council member (1931–33)
 Charles K. Djou (1996) – former United States Representative (Hawaii)
 Nanette Barragan (2005) – current United States Representative (California)
 Pat Nolan (1975) – Member of the California State Assembly, 1978-1994; Republican Assembly Leader, 1984-1988; one of eight members of U. S. Prison Rape Commission, 2005-2009, appointed by Speaker of the House of Representatives.
 William A. Munnell (1948) – former Majority Floor Leader of the California State Assembly from California's 51st State Assembly district, 1959-1961; also a judge for the Los Angeles County Superior Court, 1961-1985

Sports and media

 Terry Baker (1968) – played quarterback for the Los Angeles Rams and the CFL's Edmonton Eskimos while earning a J.D. at USC
 Ronald Barak (1968) – Olympic gymnast
 Lillian Copeland (1932) - Olympic discus champion; set world records in discus, javelin, and shot put
Philip N. Krasne (1929) – producer of the later Charlie Chan films and the Cisco Kid television series.
 Carey McWilliams (1927) –  editor of The Nation for 20 years
 Rick Neuheisel (1990) –  Former head football coach at UCLA and former UCLA quarterback.
 Amy Trask (1985) – Former CEO of the Oakland Raiders
 Joseph Wapner (1948) – Judge of The People's Court (former Los Angeles County Superior Court Judge)
 Wally Wolf (1930–1997) – swimmer, water polo player, and Olympic champion

References

Lists of people by educational affiliation in California
Lists of people by university or college in California
United States law-related lists
USC Gould School of Law alumni